The Simple Life Festival is a cultural event held in Taiwan every two years. The festival is initially organized by two Taiwanese musicians: Jonathan Lee and Landy Chang since December, 2006.
In the Simple Life Festival, its activities consist of music performance, book sharing, creative markets, and so on. In addition to large numbers of performance from singers and bands, the Simple Life Festival also provides a place for local farmers, designers of cloths or goods, and artistic creators to meet with each other. It is a platform for non-profit organizations to express their opinions, following with its goal to capture the most beautiful people and scene in Taiwan.

Central belief
“There is a corner in everyone’s mind dreaming of a simple and natural life. We hope (through the Simple Life Festival) we can aggregate diverse creative elements, and then helps this society to look for innovative industry power.” – Landy Chang

According to Landy Chang, the Simple Life Festival is not only a music festival; instead, based on the core spirit of music festival, the Simple Life Festival further extends the notion, and covers wider topics. It is composed of multiple concepts, including some international trendy issues, the launch of creative market, downshifting, the thought of doing something you like, and make something you like rewarding.

History

See also
 List of music festivals in Taiwan

References

External links
 2015 Simple Life Festival

Festivals in Taiwan